Melissa Studdard was born in Tuscaloosa, Alabama and is an American author, poet, talk show host, and professor. Her most recent book is the poetry collection I Ate the Cosmos for Breakfast. The title poem from this collection was produced as a short film and featured as an official selection at the Trinidad and Tobago Film Festival and the Minneapolis–Saint Paul International Film Festival. Her middle-grade novel, Six Weeks to Yehidah won a Forward National Literature Award and Pinnacle Book Achievement Award. The accompanying journal, My Yehidah, was released in December 2011 and was adopted by art and play therapists for clinical use in adolescent therapy sessions.

Studdard is a full-time college professor at Lone Star College–Tomball. She hosts and produces VIDA Voices & Views for Vida: Women in Literary Arts. In her podcast work she has interviewed such figures as Jane Hirshfield, Rita Dove, Julia Cameron, Robert Pinsky, Patricia Smith, Cheryl Strayed, Joy Harjo, and Krista Tippett. Studdard is also a past president of the Women's Caucus and moderated their annual meeting at the Association of Writers & Writing Programs conference.
She is also an honorary Professor at the International Art Academy in Volos, Greece.

Early life 
Melissa Studdard was born in Tuscaloosa, Alabama, United States, and was raised in Texas. She received her B.A. (1991) and M.A. (1995) from the University of Houston, and her M.F.A. (1997) from Sarah Lawrence College. While at the University of Houston, Studdard worked on the college's literary journal, Gulf Coast, as a production editor, curated the Gulf Coast Reading Series, and taught college courses for the Houston Community College System. While at Sarah Lawrence College, she worked as an assistant editor at Chelsea (magazine) and taught for City University of New York at Baruch College, John Jay College, and Hunter College. She then briefly taught at San Jose State University and the University of Houston–Downtown, prior to accepting a full-time teaching position with Lone Star College in 2001..

Works

Like a Bird with a Thousand Wings, with Christopher Theofanidis (2020)
I Ate the Cosmos for Breakfast (2014)
The Tiferet Talk Interviews (2013)
My Yehidah (2011)
Six Weeks to Yehidah (2011)

Selected short works 

Studdard's work has been published in multiple journals, magazines, newspapers, blogs sites, and anthologies, including The New York Times, Poetry (magazine),The Guardian, The Academy of American Poets' Poem-a-Day, Southern Humanities Review, Kenyon Review, Harvard Review, Verse Daily, and Psychology Today.

Awards and honors
 2020: Winner: Lucille Medwick Memorial Award for poem on a humanitarian theme for "Migration Patterns". Poetry Society of America.
 2020: Longlist: The Emerging Poet Award. Palette Poetry.
 2020: Runner Up: The Gregory O'Donoghue International Poetry Prize for "In the house, I built another house" and "When my lover says hippopotomonstrosesquippedaliophobia". Munster Literature Centre.
 2019: Winner: The Penn Review Poetry Prize for "The Pain is so resplendent it has babies". The Penn Review.
 2019: Winner: Tom Howard/Margaret Reid Poetry Contest for "Migration Patterns". Winning Writers.
 2019: Runner Up: Jeffrey E. Smith Editors' Prize'. The Missouri Review.
 2019: Winner: REELpoetry Audience Choice Award 2019 for I Ate the Cosmos for Breakfast. REELpoetry International Film Festival.
 2019: Shortlist: Aesthetica Creative Writing Award 2019 for "Fascinating the Parts of Us". Aesthetica Magazine.
 2019: Poet-in-Residence: Hermitage Artist Retreat.
 2019: Semifinalist: Jack Grapes Poetry Prize 2019. Cultural Weekly.
 2018: Winner: Kathak Literary Award 2018/19. Dhaka International Poets Summit.
 2015: Inclusion: Bettering American Poetry for "Respect"
 2015: Finalist: Readers’ Favorite Bronze Award for I Ate the Cosmos for Breakfast
 2013: Winner: International Book Award for 2013 Six Weeks to Yehidah
 2013: Winner: Readers Favorite Award for The Tiferet Talk Interviews
 2013: Winner: The Pinnacle Book Achievement Award for The Tiferet Talk Interviews
 2012: Finalist: Readers Favorite Award for Six Weeks to Yehidah
 2012: Finalist: The National Indie Excellence Award for Six Weeks to Yehidah
 2012: Winner: The Pinnacle Book Achievement Award for Six Weeks to Yehidah
 2011: Winner: The Forward National Literature Award for Six Weeks to Yehidah

References

External links 
 Author Website

Living people
21st-century American novelists
American women novelists
American women poets
Writers from Tuscaloosa, Alabama
University of Houston alumni
Novelists from Alabama
21st-century American women writers
21st-century American poets
Year of birth missing (living people)